Joyce Bawah Mogtari is a Ghanaian lawyer and politician who served as the Deputy Minister of Transport in Ghana. She is currently the special aide to the former president of Ghana, John Dramani Mahama and the flag bearer for the National Democratic Congress (NDC) for the 2020 Ghanaian elections. She is an experienced mediator and has done this on several occasions, both locally and internationally.

Early life and education 
Mogtari attended Wesley Girls' Senior High School for her secondary school education. She proceeded to Holborn College, University of London where she graduated with  a Bachelor of Laws (LL.B.) degree in 1997. She also holds a master's degree in maritime law (L.L.M.) from the International Maritime Organization (IMO) and International Maritime Law Institute (IMLI) in Malta, where she was the recipient of the IMO Legal Committee Chairman's Award for Best Overall Performance in International Transport Law. She also holds a master's degree in conflict resolution and mediation from the Kofi Annan International Peacekeeping Training Centre- Ghana.

Career 
Mogtari was formally called to the bar in 2000 and started her career with the legal firm Sey & Co. Later, she became a consultant for KPMG and the Venture Capital Trust Fund. She also served as the Head of the Legal Department and Solicitor Secretary of the Ghana Shippers’ Authority and as the head of the Ghana Shippers’ Authority from 2007 to 2013.

Politics 
Mogtari is a member of the National Democratic Congress. She has served on campaign teams and committees within the party over the years, including serving as a member of the 30-member legal team of the party. She was the spokesperson for President John Dramani Mahama's presidential campaign in the 2016 General Elections. After the elections, Mahama appointed her as his special aide and official spokesperson.

Deputy Minister of Transport 
In March 2013, Mogtari was appointed by John Dramani Mahama to serve as the Deputy Minister for Transport. She served in that capacity until January 2017. She served as the spokesperson for the John Dramani Mahama 2016 Election campaign.

Professional associations 
Mogtari is a member of the Ghana Bar Association and the African Women Lawyers Association. She is also a fellow of the USA-International Visitor Leadership Programme.

Personal life
Mogtari is married and has four children. Joyce is the younger sister of former Minister for Gender, Children and Social Protection, Otiko Afisa Djaba.

References 

1970s births
Living people
Government ministers of Ghana
Women in law enforcement
Women government ministers of Ghana
National Democratic Congress (Ghana) politicians
21st-century Ghanaian women politicians
21st-century Ghanaian lawyers
Ghanaian women lawyers
International Maritime Law Institute alumni